du Rocher-Percé (Pabok) Airport  is located  in Grande-Rivière, Quebec, Canada. The airport formerly had scheduled air service from the commuter airline Quebecair Express, before that airline's bankruptcy in 2005.

In 2000, the Liberal federal government proposed expanding the airport's runway for use by charter tour jets, since it is the closest airport to the popular tourist spot Percé, as part of a federal development package for the Gaspé region, but the plan was not carried out. Currently, neither Pabok nor nearby Michel-Pouliot Gaspé Airport has a long enough runway for most jets, though the Gaspé airport has better instrument approaches.

References

External links
 Page about this airport on COPA's Places to Fly airport directory

Registered aerodromes in Gaspésie–Îles-de-la-Madeleine